Daegok station may refer to the following railroad stations in South Korea.

 Daegok station (Goyang)
 Daegok station (Daegu Metro)